Sébastien Lareau (born April 27, 1973) is a former professional tennis player. He became the first Canadian to win a Grand Slam title by winning the 1999 US Open men's doubles with his American partner Alex O'Brien.

As a singles player
The right-handed Lareau achieved a career best singles ranking of world No. 76 in April 1995. He has a career ATP Tour event win–loss record of 99–137. Lareau's best singles tour results were:

 in 1995, the quarterfinals of the Philadelphia and St. Petersburg World Series events;
 in 1996, the fourth round of the Key Biscayne Super 9 event;
 in 1997, the quarterfinals of the Hong Kong World Series event;
 in 1998, the third round of the Australian Open; the semifinals of the Philadelphia, the quarterfinals of the Scottsdale, the semifinals of the Hong Kong, the quarterfinals of the Washington and Moscow World Series events;
 in 1999, the quarterfinals of the Tokyo Outdoor World Series event; and
 in 2001, the semifinals of the Memphis International Series Gold event.

As a doubles player
Lareau reached a career-high doubles ranking of world No. 4 in October 1999. He won 16 doubles titles on the ATP Tour. His victories included the 1996 and 1998 Stuttgart Masters, the 1999 London Queen's Club International Series, the 1999 US Open, the 1999 Paris Indoor Tennis Masters, and the 1999 ATP Doubles Championships events, all partnering Alex O'Brien; the 1999 Washington International Series and 2000 Memphis International Series Gold events, partnering Justin Gimelstob; and the 2000 Montreal/Toronto Tennis Masters and Sydney Olympics, partnering compatriot Daniel Nestor. Lareau was also a finalist in the 1996 Australian Open and ATP Doubles Championships, 1997 Australian Open, both partnering O'Brien.

Grand Slam finals

Doubles: 3 (1 title, 2 runner-ups)

Olympic finals

Doubles: 1 (1 gold medal)

ATP career finals

Doubles: 31 (16 titles, 15 runner-ups)

Doubles performance timeline

External links
 
 
 
 Sébastian Lareau – Tennis Canada

1973 births
Living people
Canadian male tennis players
Canadian people of French descent
French Open junior champions
French Quebecers
Grand Slam (tennis) champions in men's doubles
Medalists at the 2000 Summer Olympics
Olympic gold medalists for Canada
Olympic medalists in tennis
Olympic tennis players of Canada
Tennis players at the 1996 Summer Olympics
Tennis players at the 2000 Summer Olympics
Tennis players from Montreal
US Open (tennis) champions
Wimbledon junior champions
Grand Slam (tennis) champions in boys' doubles